Hoplodrina blanda (the rustic) is a moth of the family Noctuidae. It is found in the Palearctic realm (Europe, Morocco, Iran, Russia – south Urals, and southwest Siberia).

Technical description and variation

The wingspan is 31–35 mm. The length of the forewings is 13–16 mm. Forewing fawn-tinged grey, with a fuscous suffusion, with the ground colour sometimes paler, more luteous ochreous, especially in examples from W. Turkestan; costal edge pale; inner and outer lines obscurely marked; the median and praesubmarginal shades distinct; stigmata fuscous grey, with pale annuli; hindwing whitish, grey-tinged towards termen; the veins and cell mark darker; altogether darker grey in the female. Occurs throughout Northern and Central Europe and in Central Asia. These Asiatic examples — from Issyk-Kul; the defile of Little Kisil-su, Tianshan; Kappak, Alexander Mts.; and Ketmen-tjube, Sussamyr Mts.; must be separated certainly as an ab. centralasiae ab. nov. [Warren] though very possibly a distinct species; the  ground colour of the forewing is paler, tinged with pinkish brown along the two folds, and the dark markings stand out more conspicuously; the costal edge is pale; the hindwing, even in the female, is whiter, showing a distinct cell spot. Described from a series of more than a dozen males but only one female, from the above-mentioned localities; the type male from Kappak, the female  from Ketmen-tjube. Similar to and confused with Hoplodrina octogenaria and Hoplodrina ambigua. Certain identification requires dissection of the genitalia.See Townsend et al.

Biology
The moth flies in one generation from late May to early September. .

Larva ochreous with red or brown suffusion and dotted with dark; dorsal line yellowish edged with small black marks; subdorsal lines pale, dark-edged below; head pale marked with darker: on sundry low plants. The larvae feed on herbaceous plants such as Plantago, Stellaria and Rumex.

Notes
The flight season refers to Belgium and the Netherlands. This may vary in other parts of the range.

References

External links

The Rustic at UKmoths
Funet Taxonomy
Fauna Europaea
Lepiforum.de Includes photo of slide-mounted genitalia
Vlindernet.nl 

Caradrinini
Moths described in 1775
Moths of Africa
Moths of Asia
Moths of Europe
Taxa named by Michael Denis
Taxa named by Ignaz Schiffermüller